"Something's Happening" is the English version (new lyrics by Jack Fishman) of "Luglio", an Italian song written by Giancarlo Bigazzi and Riccardo Del Turco (who had a big hit with the song in Italy), and performed by Herman's Hermits.  It reached #4 in Norway, #6 in the United Kingdom, #20 in New Zealand, #25 in Australia, #84 in Canada, and #130 in the United States in 1969.  The song did best in South Africa, where it reached #3.

The song was produced by Mickie Most and arranged by John Paul Jones.

References

1968 songs
1968 singles
Herman's Hermits songs
Song recordings produced by Mickie Most
MGM Records singles
Songs written by Giancarlo Bigazzi
Songs written by Riccardo Del Turco